was a Japanese photographer.

References

Japanese photographers
1843 births
1896 deaths